The Third Division Football Tournament for the 2007 season in the Maldives started on November 12, 2011. Maabaidhoo Sports Club went on to win the tournament without losing a single game.

Stadiums
The Football Association of Maldives decides to play the matches of this year's tournament in two different stadiums; FAM No: 1 Turf ground and Henveiru Stadium.

Tournament format
The 26 teams are divided into 6 groups in the first round. The team which tops the each group will be qualified to the second round. The 6 teams qualified to the second round again will be divided into 2 groups of 3 teams in each group. The winner of each group will play in the final of the tournament.

Final

External links
 Match day news (Dhivehi) at Haveeru Online
 Club Campo to second round (Dhivehi) at Haveeru Online
 Maabaidhoo top the group by beating Muiveyo (Dhivehi) at Haveeru Online
 Eydhafushi knocked out by Maabaidhoo in the first round (Dhivehi) at Haveeru Online
 Thimarafushi the first team to advance to second round (Dhivehi) at Haveeru Online
 Kimbidhoo to second round (Dhivehi) at Haveeru Online
 8 Degree to second round (Dhivehi) at Haveeru Online
 KudaHenveiru chances narrowed to advance to second round (Dhivehi) at Haveeru Online
 Male' FC & Gaamagu wins last match (Dhivehi) at Haveeru Online

References

Maldivian Third Division Football Tournament seasons
3